The Taifa of Valencia was a medieval Moorish taifa kingdom which existed, in and around Valencia, Spain during four distinct periods: from 1010 to 1065, from 1075 to 1099, from 1145 to 1147 and last from 1229 to 1238 when it was finally conquered by the Aragon.

From 1094 to 1099 the kingdom was also subject to the rule of legendary military leader El Cid.

List of Rulers

Saqlabi non-dynastic rulers
 Mubarak and Muzaffar: 1010/1–1017
 Labib al-Fata al-Saqlabi (Tortosa c. 1009–bfr. 1039/40): 1017–1019, d. bfr. 1039
 Mujāhid al-ʿĀmirī (in Denia 1010/2–1045): 1017–1021, d. 1045, co-ruler in the beginning with Labib

Amirid dynasty

 Abd al-Aziz al-Mansur: 1021–1061
 Abd al-Malik ibn Abd al-Aziz al-Muẓaffar: 1061–1065
 To Al-Mamun of Toledo: 1065–1075
 : 1075–1085
 : 1085–1086

Dhunnunid dynasty
 Yahya al-Qadir (in Toledo 1075–1085): 1086–1092

Yahhafid dynasty

Ibn Jahhaf: 1092–1094

Dynasty of El Cid
El Cid: 1094–1099
Jimena Díaz: 1099–1102
To Castile: 1099–1102
To Almoravids: 1102–1145

'Abd al-'Aziz dynasty
Abu 'Abd al-Malik Marwan: 1145

'Jyaddid dynasty
Abu Muhammad: 1145–1146, d. 1147

Huddid dynasty
Abu Dja'far Ahmad "Zafadola": 1146

'Jyaddid dynasty (restored)
Abu Muhammad (restored): 1146–1147
To Murcia: 1147–1172
To Almohads: 1172–1229

Mardanis dynasty
Zayyan (in Onda 1228–1229, Murcia 1239–1241): 1229–1238, d. 1241
To Crown of Aragon thereafter

See also
 List of Sunni Muslim dynasties

References

 
History of the Valencian Community
11th century in Al-Andalus
12th century in Al-Andalus
States and territories established in 1010
1010 establishments in Europe
States and territories disestablished in 1238
1238 disestablishments in Europe